Rhaphiolepis bengalensis is a species of flowering plant in the family Rosaceae. The species is rated least concern on the IUCN red list.

References 

bengalensis
Taxa named by William Roxburgh
Plants described in 1832